Weymontachie Airport  is located  northwest of Weymontachie, Quebec, Canada.

References

Registered aerodromes in Mauricie